Taxus × media, sometimes known simply as Taxus media, is a conifer (more specifically, a yew) created by the hybridization of English yew Taxus baccata and Japanese yew Taxus cuspidata.  This hybridization is thought to have been performed by the Massachusetts-based horticulturalist T.D. Hatfield in the early 1900s. Taxonomy and common naming

Taxus × media is available in a large number of shrubby, often wide-spreading, cultivars under a variety of names.

Description
Like most yew species, T. × media prefers well-drained and well-watered soils, but has some degree of drought tolerance and in fact may die in conditions of excessive precipitation if the soil beneath the plant is not sufficiently well-drained.Taxus × media is among the smallest extant species in the genus Taxus and (depending upon cultivar) may not even grow to the size of what one would consider a typical tree. Immature shrubs are very small and achieve (over the time span of ten to twenty years) heights of at most  and diameters of at most , depending on the cultivar.   Furthermore, T. × media is known to grow rather slowly and is not injured by frequent pruning, making this hybrid very desirable as a hedge in low-maintenance landscaping and also a good candidate for bonsai.

ToxicityTaxus × media also shares with its fellow yew trees a high level of taxine in its branches, needles, and seeds.  Taxine is toxic to the mammalian heart.

Varieties (cultivars)
 Taxus × media var. hicksii (also known by the common name Hicks's yew or alternately, Hicks yew) is a common cultivar of this hybrid, and is the tallest and thinnest variety of T. × media, limiting itself to a  diameter, despite the fact it can achieve a height of close to .University of Illinois - Selecting Shrubs for Your Home
 Another commonly-planted cultivar of T. × media is the broader-spreading densiformis version, which can reach a diameter exceeding 10 feet; nonetheless, this cultivar does not grow much past  in height.
It is a dense multi-stemmed evergreen shrub with a low canopy about 1 foot from the ground.

References

media
Medicinal plants
Plant nothospecies
Trees of humid continental climate
Hybrid plants
Ornamental trees
Least concern plants
Plants used in bonsai